Disterigma is a genus of flowering plants belonging to the family Ericaceae.

Its native range is Mexico to Western South America.

Species:

Disterigma acuminatum 
Disterigma agathosmoides 
Disterigma alaternoides 
Disterigma appendiculatum 
Disterigma baguense 
Disterigma balslevii 
Disterigma bracteatum 
Disterigma campanulatum 
Disterigma campii 
Disterigma chocoanum 
Disterigma codonanthum 
Disterigma cryptocalyx 
Disterigma dumontii 
Disterigma ecuadorense 
Disterigma empetrifolium 
Disterigma fortunense 
Disterigma hammelii 
Disterigma hiatum 
Disterigma humboldtii 
Disterigma leucanthum 
Disterigma luteynii 
Disterigma micranthum 
Disterigma noyesiae 
Disterigma ollacheum 
Disterigma ovatum 
Disterigma panamense 
Disterigma parallelinerve 
Disterigma pentandrum 
Disterigma pernettyoides 
Disterigma pilosum 
Disterigma pseudokillipiella 
Disterigma rimbachii 
Disterigma staphelioides 
Disterigma stereophyllum 
Disterigma synanthum 
Disterigma trimerum 
Disterigma ulei 
Disterigma utleyorum 
Disterigma verruculatum 
Disterigma weberbaueri

References

Ericaceae
Ericaceae genera